The year 1882 in architecture involved some significant architectural events and new buildings.

Events
 March 19 – Construction work begins on the church of Sagrada Família in Barcelona, Catalonia, Spain, to the design of Francisco de Paula del Villar y Lozano; it is scheduled for completion to the design of Antoni Gaudí in 2026.
 September 30 – Dedication of Hearthstone House, in Appleton, Wisconsin, United States, the first residential building to be powered by a centrally located hydroelectric station using the Edison system.

Buildings and structures

Buildings opened

 March 4 – Forth Bridge, Scotland opened.
 June 29 – Russian Monument, Sofia, unveiled.
 September 8 – St. Mary's Basilica, Bangalore, India, designed by Rev. L. E. Kleiner, consecrated.
 October – Conservative Club, Princes Street, Edinburgh, Scotland, designed by Robert Rowand Anderson.
 October 10 – Selwyn College, Cambridge, England, designed by Arthur Blomfield.
 December 25 – Hotel Roanoke, a luxury hotel in Roanoke, Virginia, United States, built by the Norfolk and Western Railway.

Buildings completed

 Hotel Gaillard, Paris, designed by Jules Février.
 Palmenhaus Schönbrunn (palm house) in Vienna.
 Pro-Cathedral of St. Vincent de Paul in Tunis.
 Thomas Crane Public Library in Quincy, Massachusetts, designed by Henry Hobson Richardson.
 Normand Memorial Hall, Dysart, Scotland, designed by Robert Rowand Anderson.
 A six-story architectural folly, Elephant Bazaar, later renamed as "Lucy the Elephant", constructed by James V. Lafferty in Margate City, New Jersey, United States.

Awards
 RIBA Royal Gold Medal – Heinrich von Ferstel.

Births
 January 2 – Frederic Joseph DeLongchamps, prolific Nevada architect (died 1969)
 January 3 – David Adler, Jewish-American architect practising in Chicago (died 1949)
 May 17 – Karl Burman, Estonian architect and painter (died 1965)
 July 2 – Francis Conroy Sullivan, Canadian architect (died 1929)
 July 25 – Wolff Schoemaker, Dutch Art Deco architect (died 1949)
 October 12 – Leslie Wilkinson, Australian architect (died 1973)
 December 12 – Edward Maufe, English architect (died 1974)

Deaths
 June 29 – Joseph Hansom, English Gothic Revival architect (born 1803)
 December 4 – Virginio Vespignani, Italian architect (born 1808)

References

Architecture
Years in architecture
19th-century architecture